This is a list of estimated global populations of Marsupials species. This list is not comprehensive, as not all Marsupials have had their numbers quantified.

See also
 
Lists of organisms by population
Lists of mammals by population
Lists of elephant species by population

References

Mammals
Marsupials
Marsupials